Sky Temple may refer to:
 Temple of Heaven in Beijing, China
 Sky Temple, a map in the video game Heroes of the Storm
 Sky Temple, the final area in the video game Metroid Prime 2: Echoes

A disproven rumoured secret dungeon that could allegedly be found in The Legend of Zelda: Ocarina of Time

 Sky Haven Temple, a location in the video game The Elder Scrolls V: Skyrim
 Palace in the Sky (whose original Japanese name 天空の神殿 transliterates as "Temple of the Sky"), the final level in the video game Kid Icarus